Kieran Locke (born March 19, 1984) is a former national-team swimmer from the United States Virgin Islands. He is the older brother of fellow USVI swimmer Morgan Locke. He went to college and swam for the USA's Yale University, in the mid-2000s.

He swam for the Virgin Islands at:
World Championships: 2005, 2007
Pan American Games: 2003, 2007
Central American & Caribbean Games: 2006
Short Course Worlds: 2004

References

1982 births
Living people
Yale Bulldogs men's swimmers
United States Virgin Islands male freestyle swimmers
Swimmers at the 2003 Pan American Games
Swimmers at the 2007 Pan American Games
Pan American Games competitors for the United States Virgin Islands